Rosey Chan is a multimedia artist and musician who studied piano and composition at the Royal College of Music. Her solo concerts incorporate cinematic visuals and combine her own compositions with selected classical repertoire and electronic fusion. Her interests in collaborative projects have taken her into a world of contrasted disciplines; Architecture, Design, Poetic Spoken word, Contemporary dance, Experimental music, and Film composition.

Rosey is a Steinway Artist.

Background

Rosey Chan was born in the United Kingdom to Chinese parents. She attended the Royal Academy of Music on a piano scholarship. She then went on to be classically trained in composition, piano and violin at the Royal College of Music in South Kensington, London. She also plays guitar, accordion, and keyboards.

Career

After graduating from the Royal College of Music, Chan performed at such venues as the Royal Albert Hall, Wigmore Hall, Royal Festival Hall and Carnegie Hall.

In 2008, Chan focused expanding her repertoire to include contemporary electronic music, improvisation, film scoring, performance art and working with dance. She has presented her work at The Royal Opera House, The Royal Festival Hall, Pompidou Centre to the intimate settings of The 100 club, Le Poisson Rouge in New York, Gagosian Gallery Paris and The Serpentine Gallery London.

Contemporary art installations are an extension of Rosey Chan's work. Her multi-media performance piece March of the Jingoists premiered at the 2009 Frieze Art Fair. Her three-screen video installation Past Present Future premiered at the 2010 Hong Kong Art Fair.

Artists she has worked with include: Marina Abramović, Doug Aitken, Fanny Ardant, Antony Gormley, Patrik Schumacher, Zaha Hadid Architects, Charles Dance, Jonas Mekas, Zowie Broach, Nick Knight, Central School of Ballet and Dance.

Musicians she has collaborated with include: William Orbit, Queen, Sting, Synematik, Stargate Music, Michael Nyman, Carnet de Voyage Music, The Invisible Men, Ali Tennant, Ilan Eshkeri, Gregg Wilson, Mike Figgis, Vaal, Victoria Bond, The English Chamber Orchestra, London Contemporary Orchestra.

In 2009, Chan co-founded a piece of music, food and wine festival in Tuscany with Luca Sanjust, Mike Figgis and ex-Wine Spectator editor James Suckling.

In 2011 Chan curated cultural content for the first Hong Kong Liberatum Festival, an international cultural festival, and summit, bringing together diverse talents from Europe, America, and China. The project culminated in workshops for students in music, film, architecture, and photography, alongside talks and performances throughout the festival.

Chan supports environmental charity Client Earth. She composed and recorded (by the English Chamber Orchestra) Adagio for Planet Earth which she has dedicated to the charity.

Solo releases

Chan released her debut album ONE in 2010. It was produced by the singer-songwriter Sting and featured tracks by, Bach, Debussy, Bill Evans and Tom Waits.
Her second album 8 years of my life was released in March 2018 with a limited-edition vinyl of her solo piano improvisations. She released an electronic album in 2019 under the band name Carnet de Voyage Music. In 2020, Chan released a series of Mindful Piano pieces to help stimulate creativity, work and focus during the beginning of the London covid lockdown. During this period, she produced more singles, notably "Truth and Reconciliation", "How We Danced" and an EP "Influence" a salute to some of the iconic women who have inspired Chan (Nina Simone, Jeanne Moreau, Eva Yerbabuena, Margot Fonteyn)

Today

Chan currently lives in London. She performs and collaborates on various dance, visual art, architecture, film, fashion, music and design projects internationally.

Discography

Music releases 
 ALBUM - ONE (2010)
 ALBUM - 8 YEARS OF MY LIFE (2018)
 ALBUM - MELO DISKO (2019)
EP - INFLUENCE (2020)
SINGLE - TRUTH AND RECONCILIATION (2020)
SINGLE - HOW WE DANCED (2020)
SINGLE - UNITY (2020)
SINGLE - AFTER THE AFFAIR (2020)
SINGLE - AUDREY (2020)
SINGLE - SOLTICE (2020)
SINGLE - AUTUMN (2020)
SINGLE - THE CHINA SERIES -SHANGHAI (2020)
SINGLE - OVER THE RAINBOW (2020)
SINGLE - LIVE FROM THE ROYAL FESTIVAL HALL (2020)
CHRISTMAS SINGLE - SILENT NIGHT (2020)
CHRISTMAS ALBUM - JOY, A ROSEY CHAN CHRISTMAS (2020)
SINGLE - LIVE FROM THE ROYAL FESTIVAL HALL (2020) 
SINGLE - INFINITY (2021)
SINGLE - WATER IS LIFE (2021) 
ALBUM - SONIC APOTHECARY (MARCH 2021)

Compositions (films)
 Improvisation for the Left Hand
 China-Town 2011
 An afternoon in Como 2014
 A day in the life...
 Jaguar Cars campaign 'Alive' 
 Parametricism | Patrik Schumacher | Zaha Hadid and Rosey Chan
 Millennial 
 Adagio for Planet Earth
 Besame
 Petrolo
 My First Red Dress
 Suspicious Talks featuring Fanny Ardant
 Prague 1850
Transmissions in collaboration with Platoon, Apple Music 2020

Documentaries
 One & Other a Portrait of Trafalgar Square - Music One & Other (Red Mullet, 2009)
 Sky Arts 3D - Diva' - Music (China-Town Productions, Red Mullet 2009)
 https://vimeo.com/265660005 Just Tell The Truth, Royal Opera House,'' Deloitte (2011)

References

Year of birth missing (living people)
Living people
English women artists
English people of Chinese descent